The CSIR International Convention Centre (CSIR ICC) is a convention centre in Pretoria/Tshwane, South Africa. The Centre is situated in the east of South Africa's Capital City within the research, academic and ambassadorial hub of Tshwane and is on the grounds of the Council for Scientific and Industrial Research (CSIR).

With a R35m upgrade and expansion, the CSIR ICC now has 12 venues, including a 1000 square metre exhibition hall and outdoor dining deck.

References

Convention centres in South Africa
Buildings and structures in Pretoria